The following lists events that happened during 1992 in South Africa.

Incumbents
 State President: F.W. de Klerk.
 Chief Justice: Michael Corbett.

Events

January
 11 – Singer Paul Simon is the first major artist to tour South Africa after the end of the cultural boycott.

February
 3 – State President F.W. de Klerk and Nelson Mandela, the African National Congress leader, are jointly awarded the Felix Houphouet-Boigny Peace Prize at the Unesco headquarters in Paris.
 25 (about) – South Africa and Bulgaria sign a diplomatic agreement.
 28 – Ownership of the port town of Walvis Bay is transferred from South Africa to Namibia.
 28 – South Africa and Russia establish full diplomatic ties.

March
 12 – Citrusdal in the Cape Province becomes South Africa's first officially recognised non-racial local authority.
 18 – White South Africans vote in favour of political reforms which will end the apartheid policy and create a power-sharing multi-racial government.
 The Skweyiya Commission finds the African National Congress guilty of having a systematic policy of abuse and violation of human rights in some camps of exile.

April
 13 – Nelson Mandela announces his separation from his wife Winnie Madikizela-Mandela at a press conference in Johannesburg.

June
 4 – The co.za internet domain is created.
 17 – Violence breaks out between the African National Congress and the Inkatha Freedom Party in Boipatong, leaving 46 dead.
 21 – Nelson Mandela announces that the African National Congress will halt negotiations with the government of South Africa following the Boipatong massacre of 17 June.

July
 9 – Chief Julius Matatu, former Transkei minister and prominent traditional leader, is shot dead at his home in Mqanduli, Transkei.

August
 3–4 – Black South Africans participate in a general strike called by the African National Congress to protest the lack of progress in negotiations with the government of State President F.W. de Klerk.
 15 – South Africa plays its first rugby test since the abolishment of apartheid.

September
 7 – 29 people are killed in the Bisho massacre when the Ciskei Defence Force opens fire on about 100,000 protesters in Bisho, Ciskei.

November
 28 – The Azanian People's Liberation Army, the military wing of the Pan Africanist Congress, massacres civilians at the King William's Town Golf Club, killing four people.

December
 1 – South Korea re-establishes diplomatic relations with South Africa. South Korea first established diplomatic relations with South Africa in 1961, but withdrew its recognition in 1978 in protest of apartheid.
 19 – State President F.W. de Klerk dismisses 23 senior military officers, including 6 generals, on unfounded suspicion of unauthorized activities designed to disrupt negotiations with the African National Congress.

Unknown date
 Trevor Manuel becomes head of the African National Congress Department of Economic Planning.

Births
 17 January – Enrico Adolph, soccer player
 21 January – Ronwen Williams, football player
 29 January – Eben Barnard, rugby player
 10 February – Steven Kitshoff, rugby player
 3 March – Gideon Trotter, sprinter
 10 March – Zola Nombona, actress
 23 March – Rynardt van Rensburg, middle-distance runner
 8 April – James Hilton McManus, badminton player
 12 April – Chad le Clos, swimmer
 22 April – Rolene Strauss, Miss World 2014, model
 2 May – Grace Legote, rhythmic gymnast
 3 May – Daniel Sincuba, cricketer
 9 May – Sho Madjozi, rapper, poet, writer, and actress
 21 June – Taariq Fielies, footballer
 24 June – Dominique Scott-Efurd, long-distance runner
 26 June – Allisen Camille, badminton player
 13 July – Mogau Motlhatswi, actress
 10 August – Chanel Simmonds, tennis player
 13 August – Jenny-Lyn Anderson, South African-born Australian swimmer
 14 August – Innocent Maela, football player
 20 August – Pieter-Steph du Toit, rugby player, 2019 World Rugby Player of the Year
 22 August – Pallance Dladla, actor
 13 September – Rouge (rapper), rapper
 15 September – Emtee, rapper
 9 October – Bongani Zungu, football player
 26 October – Connie Chen, golfer
 27 November – Kabza De Small, DJ & record producer
 30 November – Ryan de Villiers, actor
 17 December – Lood de Jager, rugby player
 17 December – Quinton de Kock, cricketer

Deaths
 20 January – Geoffrey Cronjé founder of Apartheid
 18 October – Abraham Manie Adelstein, South African-born United Kingdom's Chief Medical Statistician. (b. 1916)
 25 December – Helen Joseph, activist. (b. 1905)

Railways

Locomotives
 10 September – Spoornet places the first of fifty Class 38-000 dual mode locomotives in service, the first locomotives in South Africa capable of running either on 3 kV DC electricity off the catenary or on diesel fuel alone.

Sports

Athletics
 28 March – Abel Mokibe wins his first national title in the men's marathon, clocking 2:11:07 in Cape Town.

References

South Africa
Years in South Africa
History of South Africa